Jean-Henri Focas (20 July 1909 – 3 January 1969) was a Greek-French astronomer. He was also known by his Greek name . He worked at the Pic du Midi Observatory, investigating the surface features of Mars using visual and photographic techniques.  A crater on the moon and a crater on Mars were named after him.

Focas was born in Corfu on 20 July 1909 and he was interested in astronomy since adolescence. Being very skilful in painting, the young Fokas designed wonderful sketches of the planets and the Moon. Appreciating the work, astronomer Stavros Plakidis proposed to the then director of the National Observatory of Athens Prof D. Eginitis to hire Focas at the Observatory in 1931. There, under the guidance of Eginitis and later Prof. Plakidis he acquired basic knowledge and experience in scientific observations, and made thousands of observations of sunspots, variable stars and comets. He also realized the value of long-term continuous observations of a target. Although he did not have a formal university education, the zeal, the willingness and proficiency in five European languages helped to fill the gaps in his education and established himself in the field of planetary astronomy.

When Focas learned that the Observatory of the Peak du Midi had installed a special 60 cm telescope for observing planets, he managed to obtain permission to observe this opposition of Mars in 1954. These observations established him internationally as a planetary astronomer. Returning to Athens, he brought with him new methods and techniques learned in France, photography, photometry, polarimetry and micrometric observations planets. He established a collaborative project between the National Observatory of Athens and Paris-Meudon Observatories, under which Focas visited France every year for observations. He dedicated more than 300 nights to measure the polarization of light in different areas of the Martian surface. Indeed, the last work of his life, published posthumously, was a comprehensive memorandum on the Martian polarimetry. In 1961, he was awarded a PhD from the University of Paris for a thesis entitled "Étude photométrique et polarimétrique des phénomènes saisonniers de la planete Mars". (No advisor is mentioned in his thesis. However the committee consisted of: Andre Luis Danjon, Président - Maurice Françon and Évry Schatzman, Examinateurs).

In 1960 Focas, using the Newall refractor at Penteli, observed a large white spot on Saturn's atmosphere and studied its evolution. In 1964 he visited the Lowell Observatory in Arizona to assess the huge collection of photographic plates  assembled by Earl C. Slipher since 1907. As to the planet Jupiter, Fokas devised a novel factor for the expression of atmospheric activity. At the end of the same year, he resigned from his position at the Athens Observatory to work at the IAU planetary observations collection center at the Observatory of Paris-Meudon. In his new position, having at its disposal more than 14,000 photos, he continues publishing and pursuing his own observations from Pic du Midi and Meudon. In Meudon, the completion by John Fokas cartographic work of planet Mars, commenced by Eugene Antoniadis, with the additional use of photographic and photometric techniques, influenced IAU in adopting the nomenclature system of Antoniades for the planet, making the official names of all almost all major areas of being Greek.

Focas died on 3 January 1969, at the age of 60 from a heart attack while in Greece, where he was visiting for the holidays.

Named after him was the crater Fokas (Focas) in the southern hemisphere of the Moon, with a diameter of 22 km, as well as the crater Fokas (Focas) in the northern hemisphere of Mars with a diameter of 76.5 km.

See also
 Phokas (Byzantine family)

References

1909 births
1969 deaths
20th-century Greek astronomers
20th-century French astronomers
Greek emigrants to France
Scientists from Corfu